Rabbi Barbara Aiello is the first female rabbi in Italy, as well as Italy's first non-Orthodox rabbi. She was born in Pittsburgh to a family of Italian Jewish origin and was ordained at the Rabbinical Seminary International in New York at the age of 51. She also, in 1977, created the "Kids on the Block" puppet troupe. In 2005 she conducted the first Passover seder in Sicily since 1492, when the Jews were expelled.
She also founded the Italian Jewish Cultural Center of Calabria and Sinagoga Ner Tamid del Sud (which is the first active synagogue in 500 years in Calabria).

“Kids on the Block” was a pioneering effort in helping include children with disabilities into school and society and develop  positive attitudes toward children with disabilities.  A gifted puppeteer, Aiello created a troupe of children puppets with varying disabilities e.g. using a wheelchair, visually impaired etc.  She performed wildly in elementary schools creating a positive experience for all.

See also
Timeline of women rabbis

References

External links
Official website

Year of birth missing (living people)
Living people
20th-century American rabbis
20th-century Italian rabbis
21st-century American Jews
21st-century Italian rabbis
American people of Italian-Jewish descent
Neo-Hasidism
Rabbis from Pennsylvania
Religious leaders from Pittsburgh
Women rabbis
1947 births